The 2015 Capital Football season was the third season under the new competition format in the Australian Capital Territory. The overall premier for the new structure qualified for the National Premier Leagues finals series, competing with the other state federation champions in a final knockout tournament to decide the National Premier Leagues Champion for 2015.

League Tables

2015 National Premier League ACT

The 2015 National Premier League ACT season was played over 18 rounds, from April to August 2015.

Finals

Top Scorers

2015 ACT Capital League

The 2015 ACT Capital League was the third edition of the new Capital League as the second level domestic association football competition in the ACT. 9 teams competed, all playing each other twice for a total of 16 matches.

Finals

2015 Capital Football Division 1

The 2015 ACT Capital Football Division 1 was the first edition of the new Capital League Division 1 as the third level domestic association football competition in the ACT. 10 teams competed, all playing each team twice for a total of 18 rounds.

NBOne match was postponed and subsequently could not be played.

Finals

2015 Women's Capital League and Division 1

2015 saw a combined Capital (CL) and Division One (Div1) league for the women with the two divisions splitting into separate finals post the regular season.

CL Finals

Div 1 Finals

Cup Competitions

2015 Federation Cup

2015 was the 53rd edition of the Capital Football Federation Cup. The Federation cup acts as the preliminary rounds for the FFA Cup in the ACT with the Cup winner entering the subsequent FFA Cup round of 32. In 2015, the Federation Cup, which is open to all senior men's teams registered with Capital Football, consisted of two rounds, quarter-finals, semi-finals and a final. NPL clubs entered the tournament in the second round. The Cup ran from 14 April 2015 (first round) till 20 June 2015 (final). Gungahlin clinched the 2015 Cup with a 1–0 victory in extra time over Belconnen, with Daniel Barac scoring the winning goal.

See also

Soccer in the Australian Capital Territory
Sport in the Australian Capital Territory

References

Capital Football